

D 

 
 
 
 
 
 
 
 
 
 
 
 
 
 
 
 
 
 1864 Daedalus
 
 
 
 1669 Dagmar
 
 
 
 6223 Dahl
 
 
 
 
 
 
 
 
 
 
 
 
 
 
 
 
 
 16560 Daitor
 
 
 
 
 
 
 
 1511 Daléra
 
 
 
 
 
 
 
 
 
 
 
 
 
 
 
 
 
 
 5335 Damocles
 
 
 61 Danaë
 
 
 
 
 
 
 
 
 
 
 
 
 
 
 
 
 
 
 
 
 
 
 
 
 
 
 
 
 
 
 
 
 
 
 
 
 
 
 
 
 
 
 
 
 
 
 
 
 
 
 
 
 
 
 
 
 
 
 
 
 
 
 
 
 
 
 
 
 
 
 
 
 
 
 
 
 
 
 
 
 
 
 
 
 
 
 
 
 
 1419 Danzig
 
 
 41 Daphne
 
 
 
 
 
 
 
 
 4827 Dares
 
 
 
 
 
 
 
 
 
 
 
 
 
 
 
 1991 Darwin
 
 
 
 
 
 
 
 
 
 1270 Datura
 
 
 
 
 
 
 
 
 
 
 
 
 
 
 
 
 
 
 
 
 
 
 
 
 
 
 
 
 
 
 
 
 
 
 
 
 
 4205 David Hughes
 511 Davida
 
 
 
 
 
 
 
 
 
 342843 Davidbowie
 
 
 51825 Davidbrown
 
 
 
 
 
 
 
 
 
 
 
 
 
 
 
 
 
 
 
 
 
 
 
 
 
 
 
 
 
 
 
 
 
 
 
 
 
 
 
 
 
 
 
 
 
 
 
 
 
 
 
 
 
 
 
 
 
 
 
 
 
 
 
 
 
 
 
 
 
 
 
 
 
 
 
 
 1037 Davidweilla
 
 
 
 
 
 
 
 
 
 
 
 
 
 
 
 
 
 
 
 
 
 
 
 
 
 
 
 
 
 
 
 
 
 
 
 
 
 
 
 
 
 
 
 
 
 
 
 
 3268 De Sanctis
 
 
 
 
 
 
 
 
 
 
 
 
 
 
 
 
 
 
 8815 Deanregas
 
 23131 Debenedictis
 
 
 
 
 541 Deborah
 
 
 
 
 
 
 
 
 
 4492 Debussy
 
 
 
 
 
 
 
 34351 Decatur
 
 
 
 
 
 
 
 
 
 
 
 
 
 
 
 1295 Deflotte
 
 
 
 
 
 
 
 
 
 
 
 5638 Deikoon
 
 1867 Deiphobus
 4060 Deipylos
 
 1244 Deira
 
 
 1555 Dejan
 157 Dejanira
 184 Dejopeja
 
 
 3893 DeLaeter
 
 
 
 
 
 
 
 
 
 
 
 
 
 
 
 
 
 
 395 Delia
 
 560 Delila
 
 
 
 
 
 
 
 
 
 
 
 
 
 1988 Delores
 
 
 
 
 1274 Delportia
 
 
 
 
 
 
 1848 Delvaux
 
 
 
 9641 Demazière
 
 349 Dembowska
 
 
 
 1108 Demeter
 
 
 
 
 
 
 
 
 
 11429 Demodokus
 
 18493 Demoleon
 4057 Demophon
 
 
 1335 Demoulina
 
 
 
 
 4340 Dence
 
 
 
 
 
 667 Denise
 
 
 
 
 
 
 
 
 
 
 2134 Dennispalm
 
 
 
 
 
 
 
 
 
 
 
 
 
 
 
 
 
 
 
 
 
 
 
 
 1806 Derice
 
 
 
 
 
 
 
 
 4142 Dersu-Uzala
 
 
 1339 Désagneauxa
 
 
 1588 Descamisada
 
 
 
 
 666 Desdemona
 10830 Desforges
 
 
 
 344 Desiderata
 
 
 
 
 
 
 
 
 
 
 53311 Deucalion
 
 
 
 
 
 
 
 
 
 
 
 
 
 
 
 
 337 Devosa
 1328 Devota
 
 
 15436 Dexius
 
 
 
 
 
 
 
 
 
 3247 Di Martino
 
 78 Diana
 
 
 
 
 
 
 
 
 
 
 
 
 
 
 
 
 3841 Dicicco
 
 
 13003 Dickbeasley
 
 
 
 
 
 
 
 
 
 
 
 
 209 Dido
 65803 Didymos
 
 
 
 
 
 
 5318 Dientzenhofer
 
 
 
 
 
 
 
 
 
 
 
 
 
 99 Dike
 
 
 
 
 
 
 
 
 
 
 
 
 
 
 
 
 1437 Diomedes
 106 Dione
 3671 Dionysus
 20461 Dioretsa
 423 Diotima
 
 
 
 
 
 11665 Dirichlet
 1805 Dirikis
 
 1319 Disa
 
 
 
 
 
 
 
 
 
 
 
 
 
 
 
 
 
 
 
 
 
 
 
 
 
 
 
 
 
 
 
 
 
 
 
 
 
 
 1789 Dobrovolsky
 
 
 
 
 
 
 
 
 
 
 382 Dodona
 
 
 
 
 
 
 
 
 
 
 
 
 
 
 
 
 
 7449 Döllen
 
 
 
 
 
 1277 Dolores
 
 
 
 
 
 
 
 
 
 
 
 
 
 
 
 
 
 
 
 
 3552 Don Quixote
 
 
 
 
 52246 Donaldjohanson
 
 
 
 
 
 
 
 
 
 
 
 
 
 
 
 
 
 
 
 
 
 
 
 
 
 
 
 
 
 
 9912 Donizetti
 
 
 
 
 
 
 
 
 
 
 
 
 
 
 
 
 
 
 
 
 
 
 
 
 
 
 3905 Doppler
 668 Dora
 
 
 
 
 
 
 
 
 48 Doris
 
 
 
 
 
 
 
 339 Dorothea
 
 
 
 
 
 
 
 
 
 
 
 
 
 
 
 
 
 
 25924 Douglasadams
 
 
 
 
 
 
 
 
 
 
 
 
 
 
 
 
 
 
 
 
 
 
 4489 Dracius
 
 
 
 
 
 620 Drakonia
 
 
 
 
 263 Dresda
 
 
 
 
 
 
 
 
 
 
 
 4009 Drobyshevskij
 
 
 
 
 
 
 
 
 
 
 
 
 
 
 
 1621 Druzhba
 
 
 
 
 
 
 1167 Dubiago
 
 
 
 2312 Duboshin
 
 
 
 400 Ducrosa
 
 
 
 
 
 
 
 564 Dudu
 
 367943 Duende
 
 
 
 
 
 1961 Dufour
 
 
 
 
 
 
 571 Dulcinea
 
 
 
 
 
 
 
 
 
 
 
 
 
 
 
 
 
 
 
 
 
 
 
 
 1338 Duponta
 
 
 
 
 6141 Durda
 
 
 
 
 
 
 
 
 
 
 
 
 
 
 
 
 2055 Dvořák
 
 
 
 
 
 
 2591 Dworetsky
 
 
 
 
 
 
 
 
 
 200 Dynamene
 
 1241 Dysona
 
 
 
 
 471143 Dziewanna
 3687 Dzus

See also 
 List of minor planet discoverers
 List of observatory codes

References 
 

Lists of minor planets by name